A Madea Christmas is a 2013 American Christmas comedy film directed, written, produced by and starring Tyler Perry with the rest of the cast consisting of Kathy Najimy, Chad Michael Murray, Anna Maria Horsford, Tika Sumpter, Eric Lively, JR Lemon, Alicia Witt, Lisa Whelchel, and Larry the Cable Guy. This is the first Christmas-themed film from the writer-director as it tells the story of Madea going to the town of Bucktussle Alabama with her great-niece to spend Christmas with the great-niece's daughter. This is the seventeenth film by Perry, and the eighth film in the Madea cinematic universe. It was released in theaters on December 13, 2013.

A Madea Christmas received generally negative reviews from critics and was a grossed $53.4 million worldwide.

Plot
In Atlanta, Georgia, Mabel "Madea" Simmons has been talked into getting a job at a local store by her great-niece Eileen Murphy. Madea gets fired on her first day.

Meanwhile, Eileen's daughter Lacey Williams, a teacher at a small school in Bucktussle, Alabama, is married to a white man named Conner whose plans to grow special corn earned him the ire of corn farmer Tanner McCoy. The school run by Principal Nancy Porter does not have enough money to fund their annual Christmas Jubilee, forcing Lacey to ask her ex-boyfriend Oliver to fund the school through his business. While having spoken to Tanner and his wife Amber about the progress of their son Bailey in school, Lacey calls her mother and says she will be unable to come home for Christmas, but Eileen, determined to see her daughter, brings Madea and Oliver with her to visit. Eileen hopes that Lacey and Oliver might still work out as a couple. She does not know that Lacey is married to a white man, which is not what she wanted for Lacey.

Lacey brings Oliver to a town meeting and asks Madea to look after her class. A girl named Lucy (Caroline Kennedy) steals Madea's purse while Madea tells the class a rather unorthodox version of the story of the first Christmas. When she finds her purse is missing, she loses her temper and ties Lucy to a cross decoration in the classroom much to the dismay of Lacey and Principal Porter.

Conner's parents Buddy and Kim arrive at Conner and Lacey's house for Christmas and are told to keep the marriage a secret since Eileen is staying for Christmas as well. Eileen offends Kim by cutting down her father's memory tree. Though she didn’t realize the meaning, Eileen shows no remorse for the act. She is convinced Buddy and Kim are part of the Ku Klux Klan after seeing Buddy with a sheet over his head (though he was merely engaging in foreplay with Kim), and promptly bars the door to the room she and Madea are sharing.

Lacey finds out that the sponsors called the Sheldon Construction Company are forcing the school to make the Jubilee a holiday theme as opposed to a Christmas theme and that they are responsible for many of the town’s citizens losing their jobs as well as their dam cutting off their lands' access to the river. Angered by these facts, Tanner demands that the Mayor of Bucktussle (Steve Boles) fire Lacey which the Mayor does.

Lacey’s conflict at home reaches a boiling point when Eileen and Kim argue. Lacey tells the truth about her marriage to Conner and Eileen's true feelings about whites are revealed: her husband left her for a white woman. Eileen had lied to Lacey all those years, saying he was killed by a white man. Hypocritically angered by the lies she has heard, Eileen storms out vainly hoping for a taxi to pick her up.

Lacey admits to Conner that Tanner caused her to lose her job, setting Conner off. As Eileen walks into town, she sees Tanner in his overturned burning truck and saves his life. Conner walks up to the scene and punches Tanner before demanding Eileen get in his truck. Madea and Connor's parents advise Eileen to accept Lacey's marriage. With Amber with him, Tanner arrives to apologize for everything and to thank Eileen for saving him as he will also speak with the Mayor on rehiring Lacey tomorrow. Connor finally gets Tanner to listen about his corn-growing plans.

At the Christmas Jubilee with her family, Lacey thanks the Sheldon Construction Company and announces their promises to help Bucktussle (which were not in the original agreement) by letting some water out of their dam, knowing the repercussions the company would face if they were to back out. She reveals to Oliver that she is married to Conner as the school's students led by Bailey start singing.

Cast

 Tyler Perry as Mabel "Madea" Simmons
 Kathy Najimy as Kim Williams
 Chad Michael Murray as Tanner McCoy
 Anna Maria Horsford as Eileen Murphy
 Tika Sumpter as Lacey Williams (née Murphy)
 Eric Lively as Conner Williams
 JR Lemon as Oliver
 Alicia Witt as Amber McCoy
 Lisa Whelchel as Principal Nancy Porter
 Larry the Cable Guy as Buddy Williams
 Noah Urrea as Bailey McCoy
 Ashlee Heath as Audry
 Caroline Kennedy as Lucy
 Steve Boles as the Mayor of Bucktussle
 Sweet Brown as herself 
 Antoine Dodson as YouTube Guy
 Jonathan Chase as Alfred
 Vickie Eng as Customer #6
 Daniel Mann as Austin

Soundtrack
The soundtrack for the film was released in stores by Motown Records November 25. This was the first soundtrack to a Tyler Perry film since 2010's For Colored Girls and the first Madea soundtrack since 2006's Madea's Family Reunion and 2008's Meet the Browns. It featured Smokey Robinson, Mariah Carey, Brian McKnight, James Brown, KEM, Boyz II Men, Kelly Rowland, Jeremih, Stevie Wonder, Jackson 5, Pearl Bailey, Ashanti, Kevin Ross & MPrynt.

Reception

Critical response
A Madea Christmas received negative reviews from critics. On Rotten Tomatoes, the film holds  rating, based on  reviews, with the consensus: "It boasts a few laughs, but overall, Tyler Perry's A Madea Christmas ranks among Perry's least entertaining or substantive works." On Metacritic, the film has a score of 28 out of 100, based on 20 critics, indicating "generally unfavorable reviews".  Audiences polled by CinemaScore gave the film an A− grade.

Owen Gleiberman of Entertainment Weekly gave the film  a grade B− but said that it felt like reruns: "Tyler Perry's movies haven't gotten any worse, but they haven't gotten better either, so they now carry the added disadvantage of overfamiliarity."
Variety called it "An exceptionally poor piece of holiday cash-in product, rushed and ungainly even by the low standard set by Perry's seven previous Madea films, yet it should be every bit as profitable."
The Hollywood Reporter wrote: "Bah humbug to this latest screen outing for Tyler Perry's inexplicably popular character" and criticized the clunky narrative and the hackneyed dialogue.

Accolades

Home media
A Madea Christmas was released on Blu-ray and DVD on November 25, 2014. The DVD contains a first look at the opening of the then-upcoming animated feature Madea's Tough Love.

See also
 List of Christmas films

References

External links
 
 

2013 films
2010s Christmas comedy films
American Christmas comedy films
Films scored by Christopher Young
Films about interracial romance
American films based on plays
Films directed by Tyler Perry
Films shot in Atlanta
Lionsgate films
Films with screenplays by Tyler Perry
2013 comedy films
Golden Raspberry Award winning films
2010s English-language films
2010s American films